Vondo Dam is an earth-fill type dam located on the Mutshindudi River near Sibasa, Limpopo, South Africa. It was established in 1985 and has been renovated in 1994. The dam serves mainly for irrigation purposes and its hazard potential has been ranked high (3).

See also
List of reservoirs and dams in South Africa
List of rivers of South Africa

References 

 List of South African Dams from the Department of Water Affairs and Forestry (South Africa)

Dams in South Africa
Dams completed in 1982
Buildings and structures in Limpopo
Earth-filled dams
1982 establishments in South Africa